Benedict Wallet Vilakazi (6 January 1906 – 26 October 1947) was a South African novelist, a descendant of the Zulu royal family, and author of Romantic poetry in the Zulu language. Vilakazi was also a professor at the University of Witwatersrand, where he became the first Black South African to teach University classes to White South Africans. In 1946, Vilakazi also became the first Black South African to receive a PhD.

Vilakazi Street in Soweto, which is named after the poet, is now very famous as the street where both Nelson Mandela and Archbishop Desmond Tutu once lived.

Early life and education
Benedict Vilakazi was born Bambatha kaMshini in 1906 at the Groutville Mission Station near KwaDukuza, Natal (now South Africa), the fifth child of Roman Catholic converts Mshini ka Makhwatha and Leah Hlongwane. His mother, Mrs Leah Hlongwane Vilakazi, was the daughter of Bangile, who was the sister of Queen Ngqambuza, wife to King Cetshwayo, and also the sister of the Right Reverend J Mdelwa Hlongwane ka Mnyaziwezulu, the son of Chief Matiwane.

Vilakazi split his childhood between herding the family's cattle and the local mission school until the age of 10, at which point he transferred to the St. Francis College in Mariannhill, a coeducational Roman Catholic secondary school founded by the Mariannhillers' local Trappist monastery. Here he was baptized with the name "Benedict Wallet," although at his mother's insistence he kept the surname of Vilakazi. He obtained a teaching certificate in 1923 and taught at Mariannhill and later at a seminary in Ixopo.

Writing, teaching, research
In 1933, Vilakazi released his first novel Nje nempela ("Really and Truly"), one of the first works of Zulu fiction to treat modern subject matter.  He followed it in 1935 with the novel Noma nini as well as a poetry collection Inkondlo kaZulu, the first publication of European-influenced Zulu poetry.

His poetry, heavily influenced by the verse of the European Romantics, introduced literary themes as well as both rhyme and poetic meters previously unknown in Zulu literature, while combining them with elements of the Izibongo tradition of praise poetry.

Earning a B.A. from the University of South Africa in 1934, Vilakazi began work in the Bantu studies department at the University of Witwatersrand in 1936 under linguist C. M. Doke, with whom he created a Zulu-English dictionary. Vilakazi's teaching position made him the first black South African to teach white South Africans at the university level.

Vilakazi's later novels continued to explore daily life in traditional Zulu culture, such as UDingiswayo kaJobe (1939) and Nje nempela (1944), which is the story of a polygamous Zulu family.

His poetry became increasingly political in the course of his life, dramatizing the exploitation and discrimination not only against the Zulu people, but also against other black South Africans as well.

Vilakazi is also noted for his scholarly work on oral tradition and the Zulu and Xhosa languages, which on 16 March 1946, earned him the first PhD to be awarded to a black South African.

A year after receiving his doctorate, Benedict Wallet Vilakazi died in Johannesburg of meningitis. Both his novels and poetry were well received in his own lifetime and remain so today.

Posthumous honors
On 28 April 2016, the Order of Ikhamanga - Gold (OIG) was conferred on Dr Benedict Wallet Vilakazi posthumously‚ for "his exceptional contribution to the field of literature in indigenous languages and the preservation of isiZulu culture".

Legacy

Vilakazi Street in Soweto is the only street in the world where two Nobel Laureates once lived. It is where Nelson Mandela and Desmond Tutu once lived and it was named in honour of Vilakazi.
Dr B.W. Vilakazi Secondary School in Zola 3, Soweto was named after the late Dr Vilakazi in order to commemorate his legacy.

In translation
A literary translation by R.M. Mfeka and Peggy Rutherfoord of Benedict Vilakazi's poem Umamina was published in the anthology African Voices: An Anthology of Native African Writing.

Works

Inkondlo kaZulu (poetry), Witwatersrand University Press (Johannesburg), 1935.
Noma nini (novel), Yacindezelwa Emshinini Wasemhlathuzane (Mariannhill, Natal), 1935.
UDingiswayo kaJobe (novel), Sheldon Press (London), 1939.
Nje nempela (novel), Mariannhill Mission Press (Mariannhill, Natal), 1944.
Amal'eZulu (poetry), Witwatersrand University Press, 1945.
Zulu-English Dictionary (with C. M. Doke), Witwatersrand University 
Press, 1948.
 Nini indawo *( Groutville ,Natal .

References

External links
Zulu Kingdom. Benedict Vilakazi - a short biography and bibliography - of this KwaZulu-Natal author.
"Benedict Wallet Vilakazi." Contemporary Authors Online, Gale, 2003.

1906 births
1947 deaths
People from KwaDukuza Local Municipality
Zulu people
South African poets
20th-century poets
Academic staff of the University of the Witwatersrand
Linguists from South Africa
University of the Witwatersrand alumni
Recipients of the Order of Ikhamanga
Neurological disease deaths in South Africa
Infectious disease deaths in South Africa
Catholic poets
Deaths from meningitis
20th-century linguists
Zulu-language poets
South African Catholic poets
South African Roman Catholics